Kang Gu-Nam (Hangul: 강구남; born 31 July 1987) is a South Korean former football player who played for Daejeon Citizen in the K-League.

On 17 June 2011, his football career was rescinded by the Korea Professional Football League with other accomplices.

References

External links 

1987 births
Living people
South Korean footballers
Daejeon Hana Citizen FC players
Gimcheon Sangmu FC players
K League 1 players
Association football midfielders
Sportspeople banned for life